Club Atlético Banco de la Nación Argentina (also known as Club Banco Nación) is an Argentine sports club, located in the neighborhood of Vicente López  in the homonymous partido of Greater Buenos Aires. The club is mostly known for its rugby union team, which currently plays in Primera División A, the second division of the Unión de Rugby de Buenos Aires league system.

Apart from rugby, the club hosts other activities such as aikido, artistic roller skating, basketball, field hockey, football, judo, pilates, swimming, tennis, volleyball and yoga. Banco Nación also has a section of Saint Edward's College.

History
Banco Nación was founded on October 12, 1909, as sports club by employees of Banco de la Nación Argentina, Argentina's state-owned bank. Originally located near the Colegiales railway station, the club moved to its current location on Zufriategui street in 1928.

Banco Nación's rugby team won the URBA Tournament in 1986 and 1989, as well as several rugby sevens tournaments. Hugo Porta, long-time captain of the national team, played in Banco Nación during his entire career; other recognized Pumas, such as Fabián Turnes, Pablo Hacha Dinisio, Fabio Aguja Gómez, and Rodolfo Capeltti began their careers with the team.

On July 14, 1991, Banco Nación defeated England national team in a surprising 29 to 21 victory, being the only club level team to do that in the world. Banco Nación is the only Argentine club to defeat two national teams, having also defeated Canada in 1989.

In 2010 Banco was relegated to the second division, along with Club Pueyrredón. In November, 2011, Banco Nación defeated Hurling Club 31-28 proclaiming second division champion.

In September 2014, Banco Nación returned to the first division (Grupo I) after defeating Universitario (La Plata) by 41-19.

In December 2018, Hugo Porta, the most notable rugby player in Banco Nación's history, was elected president of the institution.

Famous players
 Santiago Moresi
 Agostina Alonso
 Hugo Porta
 Fabián Turnes
 Francisco Bonanno
 Tomás Zamborlini
 Felipe Gamboa

Honours

Rugby union
 Torneo de la URBA
 First Division (2): 1986, 1989
 Second Division (1): 2011

Field hockey
Women's
Metropolitano de Primera División (4): 1968, 1970, 1973, 2018

References

External links

 

B
B
B
b
B
B